An oasis is an isolated area of vegetation in a desert.

Oasis, OASIS, or The Oasis may also refer to:

Places

Africa
 Oasis (Casablanca), a neighborhood of Casablanca, Morocco
 Oasis crater, Libya

United States
 Oasis, Iowa
 Oasis, Nevada
 Oasis, New Mexico
 Oasis, Utah
 Oasis, Wisconsin

California
 Oasis, Mendocino County, California
 Oasis, Mono County, California
 Oasis, Riverside County, California

Other places
 Antarctic oasis, a large area naturally free of snow and ice in the otherwise ice-covered continent of Antarctica
 Illinois Tollway oasis, a type of highway rest area
 Urban oasis, an open space in an urban setting

Arts, entertainment, and media

Fictional entities
 Oasis, a character from the webcomic Sluggy Freelance
 Ontologically Anthropocentric Sensory Immersive Simulation (OASIS), a virtual reality simulator accessible by players in the novel Ready Player One

Films
 Oasis (1955 film), a French adventure film
 Oasis (2002 film), a South Korean film
 The Oasis (2008 film), an Australian documentary
 Oasis (2020 film)
 The Oasis of Now, an upcoming Finnish drama film

Literature
 Oasis (anthology), a poetry collection published during World War II
Oasis, a 1996 teen novel by Gregory Maguire
Oasis, a 1988 novel by Patricia Matthews
The Oasis, an 1834 anti-slavery gift book by abolitionist Lydia Maria Child
The Oasis, a 1999 novel by Pauline Gedge
The Oasis (novel) (1949), by Mary McCarthy
The Oasis, a 2001 novel by Petru Popescu

Music

Groups and labels  
 Oasis (1980s band), a short-lived British music group
 Oasis (American band), active in the 1970s
 Oasis (band), an English rock band (1991–2009)

Albums
 Oasis (Roberta Flack album), 1988
 Oasis, an album by Kitarō, 1979
 Oasis (Eric Marienthal album), 1991
 Oasis (Akinori Nakagawa album), 2005
 Oasis (J Balvin and Bad Bunny album), 2019
 Oasis (Oasis album), 1984
 Oasis (O.C. and A.G. album), 2009
 Oasis (Shirley Scott album), 1989

Songs
 "Oasis" (Do As Infinity song), 2000
 "Oasis" (Roberta Flack song), 1988
 "Oasis" (Amir song), 2015
 "Oasis" (Gackt song), 2000
 "Oasis", a song by Amanda Palmer from Who Killed Amanda Palmer
 "Oasis", a song by Exo from Don't Mess Up My Tempo
 "Oasis", a song by Maynard Ferguson from New Vintage
 "Oasis", a song by Relient K from Forget and Not Slow Down

Television 
 Oasis (British TV series), a 1993 drama series set in South London
 Oasis (2017 film), a pilot episode of an intended 2017 British television drama series
 "Oasis" (Star Trek: Enterprise), a television episode
 Astro Oasis, a Malaysian television station
 Oasis HD, former name of the  Canadian English language specialty channel Love Nature
 Oasis (South Korean TV series), a 2023 television series

Other uses in arts, entertainment, and media
 Oasis (video game), for Microsoft Windows
 KOAS or The Oasis, a radio station in Las Vegas
 Oasis (festival), annual cultural festival of BITS, Pilani

Brands and enterprises
 Oasis (drink), a non-carbonated bottled soft drink, a product of Orangina Schweppes
 Oasis (horticulture), a brand of foam used in flower arranging
 Oasis (hotel and casino), Mesquite, Nevada, U.S.
 Oasis (spa), a New York City Day Spa founded in 1998
 Oasis Drive-In, a restaurant located in Caledonia, Ontario Canada
 OASIS International, an international American water product manufacturer
 OASIS International Hospital, a private hospital in Beijing, China
 Oasis Leisure Centre, a swimming pool and leisure complex in Swindon
 Oasis Mall, Saudi Arabia
 Oasis Restaurant, Texas, U.S.
 Oasis Shopping Centre, Australia
 Oasis Stores, a chain of clothes shops
 Oasis Terraces, an integrated development in Punggol, Singapore

Computing and technology
 OASIS (organization), an information technology standards consortium
 Oasis (software), a surveillance tracking program
 Open Access Same-Time Information System, an electric power transmission management system
 Open Architecture System Integration Strategy, the philosophy behind the Apple Macintosh computer
 Open Artwork System Interchange Standard, an integrated circuit design layout computer file format
 OASIS operating system, an operating system developed and distributed in 1977

Organisations
 The Oasis Center for Women and Girls, a U.S national educational organization
 Oasis Charitable Trust, a UK-based Christian charity
 Oasis Commission, a ministry of the Episcopal Church to LGBT people
 Oasis International Foundation, a center for religious studies in Italy

Transport
 Gin Oasis, a South Korean paraglider design
 Isuzu Oasis, a minivan
 MS Oasis of the Seas, a 2009 Royal Caribbean cruise ship
 Oasis Airlines, a defunct Spanish-based company
 Oasis Hong Kong Airlines, a long-haul Asian airline
 Oasis LRT station, a light rail station in Singapore

Medicine
 Obstetric Anal Sphincter InjurieS

See also
 OASYS (disambiguation)